Kim Rennie (born 19 October 1994) is an Australian rules footballer who plays for North Melbourne in the AFL Women's (AFLW). She has previously played for the Western Bulldogs, having been signed as a rookie in 2017, after having converted to the sport from a previous background in basketball. A few weeks later it was announced that Rennie declined the Western Bulldogs' contract offer and was delisted by the club. In the 2021 AFL Women's draft, Rennie joined North Melbourne, who used the 28th pick for her.

References

External links 

1994 births
Living people
Western Bulldogs (AFLW) players
Australian rules footballers from Victoria (Australia)
North Melbourne Football Club (AFLW) players